Theog Assembly constituency, also known as Theog-Kumarsain Assembly constituency (after 2008 delimitation of assembly constituencies, Kumarsain Assembly constituency was merged with Theog Assembly constituency), is one of the 68 constituencies in the Himachal Pradesh Legislative Assembly of Himachal Pradesh state in India. It is a segment of Shimla Lok Sabha constituency.

Members of Legislative Assembly
 Members of Territorial Council: Pandit Sadh Ram, Indian National Congress in 1957 and Nek Ram Negi, Indian National Congress in 1962.

Election candidates

2022

Election results

2017

2012

2007

2003

1998

1993

1990

1985

1982

1977

See also 
 Shimla district
 List of constituencies of Himachal Pradesh Legislative Assembly
 Kumarsain Assembly constituency
 Kumarsain
 Theog

References

External links
 
 IndiaVotes AC: Theog 2012

Assembly constituencies of Himachal Pradesh
Shimla district